Haryana State Directorate of Archaeology & Museums is a ministry and department of the Government of Haryana in India.

Description
This department came into existence in 1972 after Haryana was established as a new state in 1966 within India after being separated from Punjab. This was established as a cell under the education department in 1969, which was upgraded to a separate department in 1972. It published archaeology and excavation reports, maintains notified archaeology sites and three museums.

Banani Bhattacharyya was the deputy director in July 2021.

Museums 
Museums maintained by this department are
 Jahaj Kothi Museum at Firoz Shah Palace Complex in Hisar is a zonal museum.
 Panchkula Museum at Sector-5 Panchkula is an upcoming state museum.
 Panipat Museum near Western Yamuna Canal at Binjhol village 5 km from Panipat
 Pinjore Garden Site Museum at Pinjore Gardens in Pinjore is a site museum.
 Shrikrishna Museum at Kurukshetra is a state museum.
 Thanesar Archaeological Site Museum inside Sheikh Chilli's Tomb at Thanesar in Kurukshetra
Guru Gobind Singh Martial Art Museum at Yamunanagar.
 Jayanti Devi Archaeological Museum at Jind.

See also

 Gurukul Jhajjar Museum
 International Dolls Museum at Chandigarh
 State Protected Monuments in Haryana
 List of Monuments of National Importance in Haryana
 List of Indus Valley Civilization sites in Haryana, Punjab, Rajasthan, Gujarat, India & Pakistan
 National Parks & Wildlife Sanctuaries of Haryana
 List of Indian states and territories by highest point
 Lists of Indian Monuments of National Importance
 Archaeological Survey of India
 Haryana Tourism
 Haryana Waqf Board

References

Government of Haryana
Museums in Haryana
Archaeology in Haryana
History of Haryana
State agencies of Haryana
Government agencies established in 1972
1972 establishments in Haryana
Subnational antiquities ministries